On 24 October 1909 King Victor Emmanuel III of Italy and Nicholas II of Russian Empire concluded a secret agreement at Racconigi, known as the Racconigi Bargain.

It stated that:
 If Russia or Italy are to conclude agreements concerning Eastern Europe with another Power in future, the other party of this agreement must also participate in such new agreement.
 Italy recognizes Russian interests in the Turkish Straits should be controlled by Russia while in return Russia recognizes Italian interests in Tripoli and Cyrenaica.

From Italy's point of view, the Racconigi Bargain facilitated Italy's  preparations for the Italo-Turkish War, two years later, in which Italy conquered Tripoli and Cyrenaica.

References

The Racconigi Bargain

World War I
Treaties concluded in 1909
Treaties of the Russian Empire
Treaties of the Kingdom of Italy (1861–1946)
1909 in Italy
1909 in the Russian Empire
Italy–Russia relations
Bilateral treaties of Russia
Racconigi